William Davenport Adams (28 December 185126 July 1904) was an English journalist, drama critic, and author. He was the son of the prolific author William Henry Davenport Adams, and his wife and two sisters also wrote.

Biography
Born in on 28 December 1851 at Park Terrace, New Park Road, Brixton, London. the son of William Henry Davenport Adams, also a journalist and author, and Sarah Esther Morgan (13 August 18351908), the daughter of shoemaker Timothy Morgan. The couple had married at St. Mary's Church in the Parish of Paddington, London on 26 December 1850.

Adams was educated at Merchant Taylors' School in London, The Glasgow Academy, and the University of Edinburgh. However, poor health prevented him from getting a good degree at Edinburgh.

The family were quite involved in literature and drama. Not only did he have the example of his father, who was a prolific author with over 100 books to his credit, but his two sisters, Florence Mary Susan Ballingall (4th quarter 18554th quarter 1943) and Ellinor Lily Davenport Adams (4th quarter 185811 April 1913) were also writers and gave their occupation as "journalist" and "author" respectively, in the 1901 census and both gave it as journalism and literature" in the 1911 census. Florence seems to have written mainly children's one-act plays, mainly about fairies. Ellinor wrote girls' stories mostly. Most of her later stories were published by Blackie and Son for whom she acted as a publisher's reader. His brother Alfred Elliot (later Davenport) Adams (1st quarter 18611947) became an actor,, and married an actress.

Adams married Caroline Estelle Körner (c. 18551st quarter of 1928), the daughter of the late John Körner, a Polish exile from a noble family who had been earning his living as a teacher. The marriage was celebrated at St Mary's Episcopal Church in Glasgow. The 1911 census shows that Caroline had no children. Caroline was also a writer, and wrote a number of compilations as Estelle Davenport Adams. However, her health was not good and she was an invalid at the time of his death.

Adams died suddenly at his home, 17 Burstock Road, Putney, on 26 July 1904. His death was credited to overwork and worry about the illness of two members of his family. The overwork was ascribed to considerable pressure he was under to complete the first volume of A Dictionary of the Drama, which was then in the hands of the binders. He lost consciousness after an illness of a few hours and never recovered.

Work

Journalism
As a youth he contributed to boys' magazines, and became a journalist at 20 (i.e. in 1871). In 1873 he first began to do reviews of theatrical performances in a serious way. In 1875, the year of his marriage, he was appointed as leader writer and the literary and drama critic for the Glasgow Daily News. He then served as the editor of the Greenock Advertiser form 1878 to 1880. From 1880 to 1882 he was the acting editor of the Nottingham Daily Guardian, and from 1882 to 1885 he was editor of the Derby Mercury.

Adams moved to London in 1885 where he joined the editorial staff of The Globe. He was the writer of many of the "turnover articles" for The Globe. These articles were essays and sketches of social, descriptive, or a humorous kind, and appeared on the first page of the newspaper. These articles were a famous feature of The Globe, demanded a "facile pen" to produce them on such a wide range of topics.

With time, Adams became more and more involved with reviewing, and he serves as the head of the reviewing department at The Globe until his death. His wrote a column on Plays and Players not only for The Globe but also for The People.

Books
Most of Adams books were compilations of the work of others, selected by Adams and with notes and annotations by him. He also wrote a few compilations of his own essays, as well as his two major reference works: A Dictionary of English Literature (1877) and the first volume of a planned two volumes of A Dictionary of the Drama (1904). The first of these was a dictionary with the names of authors, the titles of novels, poems, and plays, famous characters, familiar phrases and first striking words, as well as reference articles on the novel, the sonnet, etc. The Graphic described the work as "a book of reference of a most agreeable, and in many respects a novel class." More than forty years after publication the Westminster Gazette called it "an extremely useful work", although in need of bringing up to date.

Adams was working on the Dictionary of the Drama when he died, and the effort to complete it was cited in at least one obituaries as being a contributory factor to his death, while other referred more generally to overwork and worry about ill family members as being the two contributing factors. Only the first volume (A-G) was published. The work had been over twenty years in preparation, with the first notice of the work was in November 1881. It was said to have been in preparation by Adams for a considerable time and would be published in 1882. In December 1881, it was announced that the book would soon be published by Chatto and Windus In December 1882, it was stated that the book would be published in a day or two. In April 1885, the book was "nearly finished" and was to be published on "and early day". In November 1893, the book was expected to be published in the spring of 1894. The first volume was eventually published on 8 September 1904. It is no wonder that The Bystander noted that Adams had a unique claim to fame in that the book had been advertised at the top of Chatto and Windus's list for a quarter of a century.

When published, the first volume was said to be "astonishing in its variety and completeness." There was some confusion about the second volume as some sources said that the second volume was passing through the press at the time of his death,  but other sources make clear that it was the first volume that was in press at the time of his death. Fourteen years after publication, no second volume had been published, and the Westminster Gazette reported that John Parker, the compiler of Who's Who in the Theatre was to complete the dictionary as well as revising the first volume. However, the work seems not to have gone ahead, and no publication record could be found.

The following list of works has been drawn mainly from a search on the Jisc Library Hub Discover website, supplemented by searches for confirmation of details or for any missing details at the British Library, WorldCat, and in the British Newspaper Archive.

Notes

References

External links
 
 

1851 births
1904 deaths
People educated at Merchant Taylors' School, Northwood
People educated at the Glasgow Academy
Alumni of the University of Edinburgh
English editors
English male non-fiction writers
English critics